Brent is a city in Bibb County, Alabama, United States. At the 2020 census, the population was 2,972.

History
Brent was founded in 1898 along the Gulf, Mobile & Ohio Railroad line in the southern portion of Bibb County, named after surveyor Brent H. Armstrong. The community was incorporated in 1913.

On May 27, 1973, Brent was almost completely destroyed by an F4 tornado during an outbreak of violent weather in the Deep South, killing 5 people and injuring 56 in the area. The tornado was on the ground for 139 miles (224 km), currently the longest track to date in Alabama history, beginning just northeast of Demopolis in Hale County and eventually dissipating at Cheaha Mountain in Clay County. Adjacent Centreville received significant damage as well as locations in nearby counties. Brent was able to be rebuilt before being hit by another EF3  on March 25, 2021, also damaging the adjacent town of Centreville were to have the Bibb County Airport rendering the airport a total loss.

Geography
Brent is located near the center of Bibb County at 32°56'24.864" North, 87°10'29.935" West (32.940240, -87.174982). It lies in the Cahaba River valley and is adjacent to the city of Centreville, the county seat, which is across the Cahaba River from the city. U.S. Route 82 passes through the northern part of town, bypassing the town center, and leads northwest  to Tuscaloosa and southeast  to Montgomery, the state capital.

Climate
The climate in this area is characterized by hot, humid summers and generally mild to cool winters.  According to the Köppen Climate Classification system, Brent has a humid subtropical climate, abbreviated "Cfa" on climate maps.

Demographics

2020 census

As of the 2020 United States census, there were 2,972 people, 1,055 households, and 762 families residing in the city.

2010 census
As of the census of 2010, there were 4,947 people, 1,178 households, and 788 families residing in the city. The racial makeup of the city was 53.5% Black or African American, 45.1% White,  0.1% Native American, 0.0% Asian, 0.5% from other races, and 0.6% from two or more races. 2.1% of the population were Hispanic or Latino of any race.

There were 1,178 households, out of which 30.5% had children under the age of 18 living with them, 38.9% were married couples living together, 23.6% had a female householder with no husband present, and 33.1% were non-families. 30.7% of all households were made up of individuals, and 12.0% had someone living alone who was 65 years of age or older. The average household size was 2.47 and the average family size was 3.10.

In the city, the population was spread out, with 15.6% under the age of 18, 10.3% from 18 to 24, 39.4% from 25 to 44, 25.8% from 45 to 64, and 8.9% who were 65 years of age or older. The median age was 36.2 years. For every 100 females, there were 209.2 males. For every 100 females age 18 and over, there were 278.8 males.

The median income for a household in the city was $35,044, and the median income for a family was $42,440. Males had a median income of $43,211 versus $22,010 for females. The per capita income for the city was $16,799. About 14.9% of families and 18.6% of the population were below the poverty line, including 25.1% of those under age 18 and 38.4% of those age 65 or over.

Government
Brent is governed via the mayor-council system. The city council consists of five members each elected from single member districts. The mayor, currently Bobbie White, is elected by the entire city.

The Alabama Department of Corrections operates the Bibb Correctional Facility in Brent.

The United States Postal Service operates the Brent Post Office.

Transportation
Intercity bus service is provided by Greyhound Lines.

Notable people
 Charles Cleveland, former professional basketball player for the Philadelphia 76ers
 The visionary art environment of outsider artist and Methodist minister George Paul Kornegay was based on a hill near Brent.

References

External links
City of Brent official website

Cities in Alabama
Cities in Bibb County, Alabama
Birmingham metropolitan area, Alabama